Padanatha Mohammed Sayeed (10 May 1941 – 18 December 2005) was a leader of the Indian National Congress party. He was a member of Lok Sabha for ten consecutive terms from 1967–2004 representing Lakshadweep.


Early life
P.M. Sayeed was born in Andrott Island, Lakshadweep. He studied at Government Arts College, Mangalore and at Sidhartha College of Law, Mumbai.

Political career
P.M. Sayeed was first elected to Lok Sabha in 1967 at the age of 26. He became the first and only Parliamentarian from Lakshadweep (Lok Sabha constituency) to become a Cabinet Minister. He served as Union Minister of State, Steel, Coal and Mines in 1979–1980; Union Minister of State, Home Affairs 1993–1995; Union Minister of State, Information and Broadcasting 1995–1996; and Deputy Speaker, Lok Sabha 1998–2004. He was a member of the Congress Working Committee.

Sayeed won the Lok Sabha elections in 1967 and continued to win every election till 2004 serving for ten consecutive terms as Member of Parliament for Lakshadweep in total. This run was halted when he was defeated by Dr P Pookunhikoya of Janata Dal (United) in the 2004 general election by 71 votes. He then became a member of the Rajya Sabha representing the National Capital territory of Delhi. He was Union Power Minister when he died of a cardiac arrest in Seoul on 18 December 2005 .

Personal life
His son Muhammed Hamdulla Sayeed, a Law graduate from Indian Society College in Pune, was elected from the Lakshadweep constituency  at the age of 26. He was the youngest MP in the 15th Lok Sabha.

References

Indian National Congress politicians from Lakshadweep
Indian Muslims
1941 births
2005 deaths
Malayali politicians
Deputy Speakers of the Lok Sabha
India MPs 1967–1970
India MPs 1971–1977
India MPs 1977–1979
India MPs 1980–1984
India MPs 1984–1989
India MPs 1989–1991
India MPs 1991–1996
India MPs 1996–1997
India MPs 1998–1999
India MPs 1999–2004
Lok Sabha members from Lakshadweep
Indian National Congress (U) politicians
Ministers of Power of India